Elias Pavlidis (born May 4, 1978, in Yekaterinburg, Sverdlovsk), sometimes written Helias or Ilias Pavlidis, is a Greek amateur boxer best known to compete at the Athens Olympics 2004. He was born in Russia.

Career
At the 2003 World Championships he lost his first bout in the men's light-heavyweight division to eventual winner Evgeny Makarenko from Russia.

At the 2004 Summer Olympics in Athens he defeated Ali Ismayilov, but was stopped on cuts in the quarterfinal by Egyptian Ahmed Ismail when he was leading 18–12 in the third round. The Egyptian boxer hit Pavlidis with his elbow at the nose, but the referee didn't disqualify him. Prior to the Athens Games he won the 2004 Acropolis Boxing Cup in Athens, Greece by defeating Kazakhstan's Beibut Shumenov in the final of the light heavyweight division.

He went up a division to Heavyweight 201 lbs limit in 2007 and was more successful winning the 2007 EU boxing championships where he defeated future world champion Clemente Russo in the final 13:8.

At the World Championships he was defeated by John M'Bumba.

In Beijing he lost his second bout to Osmay Acosta.

External links
 yahoo
 Olympics
 EU tournament
 sports-reference

1978 births
Living people
Sportspeople from Yekaterinburg
Olympic boxers of Greece
Boxers at the 2004 Summer Olympics
Boxers at the 2008 Summer Olympics
Greek male boxers
Heavyweight boxers